The Cornell–Syracuse lacrosse rivalry is an intercollegiate lacrosse rivalry between Cornell Big Red and Syracuse Orange. The two New York state programs are historical lacrosse powers, combining for 23 national titles. Since the creation of the NCAA Division I Men's Lacrosse Championship, Cornell and Syracuse have appeared in 40 Final Fours and captured 14 total titles. Syracuse leads the series 66–38–1 through 2020.

Series History

Early Years (1920s to 1960s) 
Only an hour away from each in upstate New York, the two programs first met in 1920 and would meet annually until World War II would halt the matchup in 1943. During this early stretch, both programs experienced streaks of success in the rivalry. Syracuse would win eight of the first nine meetings, including the initial game, a 5 to 3 victory. Each team would maintain five game winning streaks in the 1930s, while Cornell won the last game prior to World War II.

After the Big Red won the 1942 contest in Ithaca, Syracuse would embark on the longest streak in the history of the rivalry, ripping off 16 straight games from 1946 to 1957. A 22–5 victory was the largest in series history at the time, but the following year the narrative flipped.

Cornell Dominance (1958 to 1982) 
Cornell would dominate the contest in 1958 and would take five of seven games for its best series stretch since the 1930s. In 1966, the Big Red would win the first of 12 straight meetings against the Orange. During this period, Cornell was one of the top lacrosse programs in the country, capturing three national titles and appearing in six Final Fours. In contrast, under Roy Simmons Jr., Syracuse would only make their first NCAA tournament appearance in 1979. The games were increasingly lopsided during this period; the Big Red won seven by at least ten goals, including a 27 to 4 rout in 1974. Simmons would call the era's Cornell squads "the finest attack I've ever seen." Syracuse would halt the streak with a 1980 victory in Ithaca, but would not truly take back the series until 1983.

Syracuse's Rise to National Power (1983 to 1999) 
In the 1983 meeting, #4 Syracuse defeated Cornell en route to its first national title in 26 years. The next nine matchups would feature an unprecedented streak where the winning team was ranked either #1 or #2 on top of the polls. After four consecutive Orange victories, Richard Moran's team would sweep the 1987 meetings, including the first postseason game between in the two. In the 1987 NCAA Division I Men's Lacrosse Championship, the Big Red would top Syracuse in a thrilling Final Four game by a score of 18–15. The Orange would get revenge the following year, topping unseeded Cornell in the championship game to capture their second NCAA title. Syracuse would dominate the rest of the century, winning four more national titles and the remaining eleven matchups between the two. Cornell would struggle, only making two more tournament appearances, neither time escaping the first round.

Recent Years (2000 to Present) 
The 21st century brought renewed energy, as under third-year head coach Dave Pietramala, the Big Red would return to the tournament after a successful 2000 season, headlined by a 13–12 victory over the Orange in Ithaca. With Jeff Tambroni taking the helm in 2001, Cornell would return to the ranks of the nation's elite and restore balance to the series. The rivalry reached a new crescendo in 2009, as the two teams meet in Foxborough to decide the national title. In an instant classic, Syracuse nabbed its 11th national title with a 10–9 overtime defeat of the Big Red, their second victory over the team in a championship game. After forcing a turnover with 27.6 seconds remaining in the game, Cornell seemed poised for their fourth national title until Kenny Nims stripped the ball and finished the break with four seconds left to force an extra period. In overtime, Syracuse senior Dan Hardy assisted Cody Jamieson, who sunk the game-winner to successfully defend the Orange's 2008 crown. Since then, Syracuse has defeated in Cornell in six of the last eleven meetings, in a relatively balanced era for a rivalry driven by long streaks. Recently, Cornell prevailed over the Orange in their fourth postseason game, a 10 to 9 victory in the 2018 First Round. The 2020 contest was cancelled due to the COVID-19 pandemic, the first year without the annual game since 1978 and only the fifth overall since the series began in 1920.

Rival Accomplishments
The following summarizes the accomplishments of the two programs.

Due to NCAA violations, Syracuse was forced to vacate its 1990 NCAA title and tournament appearance.

Game Results

References

College lacrosse rivalries in the United States
Cornell Big Red men's lacrosse
Syracuse Orange men's lacrosse